The 40th Wisconsin Infantry Regiment was a volunteer infantry regiment that served in the Union Army during the American Civil War. It was among scores of regiments that were raised in the summer of 1864 as Hundred Days Men, an effort to augment existing manpower for an all-out push to end the war within 100 days.

Service
The 40th Wisconsin was organized at Madison, Wisconsin, and mustered into Federal service on June 14, 1864.

The regiment was mustered out on September 16, 1864.

Casualties
The 40th Wisconsin suffered 1 officer and  18 enlisted men who died of disease, for a total of 19 fatalities.

Notable people
 W. C. Bailey was corporal in Co. F.  After the war he became a California state legislator and city manager of San Jose, California.
 James M. Bingham was major of the regiment.  After the war he became the 20th speaker of the Wisconsin State Assembly and the 13th Lieutenant Governor of Wisconsin.
 Orrin W. Blanchard, the brother of Caleb S. Blanchard, was surgeon of the regiment.
 William Avery Cochrane was a private in Co. B.  After the war he became a Wisconsin state legislator.
 Alexander J. Craig was adjutant of the regiment.  After the war he became the 8th Superintendent of Public Instruction of Wisconsin.
 Pitt Noble Cravath, son of Prosper Cravath, was a private in Co. D.
 Samuel Fallows was lieutenant colonel of the regiment and later served as colonel of the 49th Wisconsin Infantry Regiment.  Earlier in the war, he was chaplain of the 32nd Wisconsin Infantry Regiment.  After the war he became the 9th Superintendent of Public Instruction of Wisconsin and Presiding Bishop of the Reformed Episcopal Church.
 Edward E. Merritt was a private in Co. G.  After the war he became a Wisconsin state legislator.
 John Coit Spooner was a private in Co. D.  After the war he became a United States Senator.

See also

 List of Wisconsin Civil War units
 Wisconsin in the American Civil War

References
The Civil War Archive

Notes

Military units and formations established in 1864
Military units and formations disestablished in 1864
Units and formations of the Union Army from Wisconsin
1864 establishments in Wisconsin